André Göransson and Sem Verbeek were the defending champions but chose not to defend their title.

Sriram Balaji and Ramkumar Ramanathan won the title after defeating Hans Hach Verdugo and Miguel Ángel Reyes-Varela 6–4, 3–6, [10–6] in the final.

Seeds

Draw

References

External links
 Main draw

Cassis Open Provence - Doubles